The 2000–01 Vyshcha Liha season was the 10th since its establishment. FC Dynamo Kyiv were the defending champions.

Teams

Promotions
Stal Alchevsk, the runners-up of the 1999–2000 Ukrainian First League  – (debut)

Note: the 1999–2000 Ukrainian First League was won by the second team of Dynamo Kyiv, FC Dynamo-2 Kyiv, which could not be promoted.

Location

Managers

Managerial changes

League table

Results

Top goalscorers

Notable Transfers
Georgi Demetradze, FC Dynamo Kyiv to Real Sociedad
Serhiy Zakarlyuka, CSCA Kyiv to FC Metalurh Donetsk

External links
ukrsoccerhistory.com - source of information

Ukrainian Premier League seasons
1
Ukra